The surface road layout in Washington, D.C., consists primarily of numbered streets along the north–south axis and lettered streets (followed by streets named in alphabetical order) along the east–west axis.  Avenues named for each of the 50 U.S. states crisscross this grid diagonally, and where the avenues intersect, traffic circles often occur. Many circles are named for American Civil War generals and admirals, while several neighborhoods take their names from nearby circles. There are approximately 36 roundabouts currently in the District.

Northwest 
 Anna J. Cooper Circle – intersection of 3rd and T Streets in LeDroit Park
 Blair Circle – intersection of 16th Street, Eastern Avenue, Colesville Road, and North Portal Drive; circle is split between North Portal Estates and Silver Spring, Maryland
 Chevy Chase Circle – intersection of Western and Connecticut Avenues, Chevy Chase and Magnolia Parkways, and Grafton Street; circle is only half within the District; the other half is in Chevy Chase, Maryland
 Dupont Circle – intersection of Connecticut, Massachusetts, and New Hampshire Avenues and 19th and P Streets, with an underpass for Connecticut Avenue and an express lane for Massachusetts Avenue
 Grant Circle – intersection of New Hampshire and Illinois Avenues and Varnum and 5th Streets
 Juárez Circle – intersection of New Hampshire and Virginia Avenues, 25th St, and Interstate 66, with an underpass for Interstate 66; Virginia Avenue cuts through the center of the circle
 Kalorama Circle – intersection of 24th Street, Belmont, and Kalorama Roads
 Logan Circle – intersection of Rhode Island and Vermont Avenues and 13th and P Streets
 Observatory Circle – intersection of Massachusetts Avenue and 34th Street; the roadway does not form a complete circle (see United States Naval Observatory and Number One Observatory Circle)
 Peace Circle – intersection of First Street and Pennsylvania Avenue 
 Pinehurst Circle – intersection of Western and Utah Avenues and 33rd and Worthington Streets; this forms a semicircle along the border with Maryland
 Plymouth Circle – intersection of Plymouth Street and Parkside Lane
 Scott Circle – intersection of Rhode Island and Massachusetts Avenues and 16th Street, with an underpass for 16th Street
 Sheridan Circle – intersection of Massachusetts Avenue and R and 23rd Streets
 Sherman Circle – intersection of Kansas and Illinois avenues and Crittenden and 7th Streets
 Tenley Circle – intersection of Wisconsin and Nebraska Avenues, Fort Drive, and Yuma Street
 Thomas Circle – intersection of Massachusetts and Vermont Avenues and 14th and M Streets, with an underpass for Massachusetts Avenue
 Thompson Circle – near the intersection of 31st Street and Woodland Drive
 Ward Circle – intersection of Massachusetts and Nebraska Avenues
 Washington Circle – intersection of New Hampshire and Pennsylvania Avenues and K and 23rd Streets, with a K Street underpass
 Wesley Circle – intersection of Massachusetts and University Avenues and 46th and Tilden Streets
 Westmoreland Circle – intersection of Western and Massachusetts Avenues, Butterworth Place, and Wetherill Road; this circle is only half within the District; the other half is in Maryland

Northeast 
 Columbus Circle – intersection of Delaware, Louisiana, and Massachusetts Avenues and E and First Streets; Union Station and its access roads interrupt this circle on one side, making it more of a semicircle. It is also known as Columbus Plaza. Prior to the construction of the Columbus Memorial at its center in 1912, it was called Union Station Plaza.
 Dave Thomas Circle -  triangular area bounded by Florida Avenue, New York Avenue and First Street Northeast. Though not part of the original city design, traffic patterns mimic other circles.
 Truxton Circle – now defunct, existing only as the name of a neighborhood; formerly the intersection of Florida Avenue, North Capitol Street, Q Street NW, and Q Street NE; this circle lay on the border of Northwest and Northeast Washington. There are possible plans to rebuild the circle.
 Unnamed circle at the intersection of New York Avenue, West Virginia Avenue, and Montana Avenue
 Unnamed circle at the intersection of Brentwood Road, Bryant Street, and 13th Street

Southeast 
 Barney Circle – intersection of Pennsylvania and Kentucky Avenues 17th Street, and Southeast Boulevard, with an underpass for RFK Stadium parking
 Ellipse Circle - intersection of 14th St SE and Pennsylvania and Potomac Avenues.
 Maritime Circle – intersection of M St SE and 13th Street SE.
 Randle Circle – intersection of Massachusetts, Minnesota, and Branch Avenues; K and 32nd Streets; and Fort DuPont Drive.
 Stadium Circle - intersection of East Capitol St, 22nd St NE & SE, C St NE, Independence Ave around RFK Stadium and is divided between the Northeast and Southeast quadrants of the city.

Southwest
Benjamin Banneker Circle – Off L'Enfant Promenade, south of Interstate 395
Garfield Circle – intersection of First Street and Maryland Avenue
Lincoln Memorial Circle – intersection of 23rd Street, Henry Bacon and Daniel French Drives, and the Arlington Memorial Bridge; surrounds the Lincoln Memorial and is divided between the Southwest and Northwest quadrants of the city
 Unnamed circle at the western end of Arlington Memorial Bridge connecting the bridge to the George Washington Memorial Parkway, Memorial Drive (which leads to Arlington National Cemetery), and Washington Boulevard (Virginia State Route 27); this circle is located on Columbia Island in the Potomac River, and thus falls within the District of Columbia
 Unnamed circle at the intersection of Third and G Streets

Squares
Washington, D.C. also has a number of squares that serve the same purpose as a traffic circle, but are not true roundabouts.
 Lincoln Square - intersection of 11th Street NE and SE on the west, 12th Street NE and SE on the west, 13th Street NE and SE on the east, East Capitol Street, Massachusetts Avenue, North Carolina Avenue, and is divided between the Northeast and Southeast quadrants of the city.

 Stanton Square - intersection of Maryland Avenue and Massachusetts Avenue in the Capitol Hill neighborhood of Northeast, Washington, D.C. It is bounded by 4th Street to the west and 6th Street to the east. North and south of the park are the respective westbound and eastbound lanes of C Street, NE.

Photos

See also

 Geography of Washington, D.C.
 Streets and highways of Washington, D.C.
 Transportation in Washington, D.C.

References

Circles
Circles in Washington D.C.
Circles